Walter Borthwick (9 January 1890 – 15 March 1969) was a Scottish professional footballer who played in the Scottish League for Partick Thistle, Hibernian, Nithsdale Wanderers and Leith Athletic as a right back.

Personal life 
Borthwick's older brother Jack also became a footballer. He later worked as a school janitor and died of cardiac arrest in 1969.

Career statistics

Honours 
Partick Thistle

 Scottish Cup: 1920–21

References

Scottish footballers
Association football midfielders
Hibernian F.C. players
People from Leith
East Fife F.C. players
Cowdenbeath F.C. players
Scottish Football League players
Footballers from Edinburgh
Association football fullbacks
1890 births
1969 deaths
Leith Athletic F.C. players
Partick Thistle F.C. players
Dalbeattie Star F.C. players
Nithsdale Wanderers F.C. players
Janitors